"Schöne Bescherung" (roughly Happy holidays; lit. Nice gift-giving, also Nice mess) is a single by Die Toten Hosen. In concept, the song is a Christmas greeting.

Another version of the song is available on The Battle of the Bands.

Track listing
 "Schöne Bescherung" (Breitkopf, Frege, von Holst, Meurer, Trimpop/Frege) − 3:02
 "Willi's weiße Weihnacht" (Willi's white Christmas) (Breitkopf, Frege, von Holst, Meurer, Trimpop/Frege) − 2:35
 "Knecht Ruprechts letzte Fahrt" (Knecht Ruprecht's last ride) (Breitkopf, Frege, von Holst, Meurer, Trimpop/Frege) − 3:46

1983 singles
Songs written by Michael Breitkopf
Die Toten Hosen songs
Songs written by Campino (singer)
Songs written by Andreas von Holst
1983 songs